Meprednisone is a glucocorticoid. It is a methylated derivative of prednisone.

See also
 Glucocorticoid
 Corticosteroid

References

Diols
Glucocorticoids
Pregnanes
Triketones